Saints Jovita and Faustinus were said to be Christian martyrs under Hadrian.  Their traditional date of death is 120.  They are patron saints of Brescia.

Traditional vita
Tradition states that they were members of a noble family of Brescia in Lombardy (northern Italy).  Jovinus, the older brother, was a preacher; Faustinus, a deacon. For their fearless preaching of the Gospel, they were arraigned before the Roman Emperor Hadrian, who at Brescia, Rome and Naples, subjected them to frightful torments, after which they were beheaded at Brescia in the year 120, according to the Bollandists, although historian Paul Allard (Histoire des Persécutions pendant les Deux Premiers Siècles, Paris, 1885) places the date as early as 118.

Saint Faustinus of Brescia, a bishop of Brescia and an alleged descendant, compiled their Acts.

Veneration
The many "Acts" of these saints are chiefly of a legendary character. The Jesuit Fedele Savio questioned nearly every fact related of them except their existence of the martyrdom, which are too well attested by their inclusion in so many of the early martyrologies and their extraordinary cult in their native city, of which from time immemorial they have been the chief patrons. Savio emphasizes that the saints are not to be identified with the fabulous figures in the Acts.

It is believed that they were martyred at a site that either was, or later became, a Roman cemetery. A church was built there called Santi Faustino e Giovita ad sanguinem. Its dedication was later changed to Saint Afra. {Saint Afra's was destroyed during the bombing of World War II).
  
Their common feast day on 15 February, the traditional date of their martyrdom, was inserted into the General Roman Calendar. It was removed in 1969, because their "Acts are completely fabulous, treating Jovita as a preacher, although she was a woman and a man was Faustinus."   The two saints remain listed in the Roman Martyrology, the official, though professedly incomplete, list of the saints recognized by the Catholic Church. The cities of Rome, Bologna, Verona and Malečnik share with Brescia possession of their relics.

A lake partially in the town of St. Leo, Florida has been called Lake Jovita since its discovery by Judge Edmund F. Dunne on February 15, 1882. The nearby community of San Antonio changed its name to Lake Jovita in 1927 before reverting in 1933.

References

Sources and external links
Faustinus at Patron Saints Index
Saint of the Day, February 15: Jovita and Faustinus  at SaintPatrickDC.org
 San Faustino

2nd-century Christian martyrs
Sibling duos
120 deaths
Year of birth unknown
Ante-Nicene Christian saints
Groups of Christian martyrs of the Roman era